is  the former Head coach of the Hamamatsu Higashimikawa Phoenix in the Japanese Bj League.

Head coaching record

|- 
| style="text-align:left;"|Tokorozawa Broncos
| style="text-align:left;"|1999
| -||-||-|||| style="text-align:center;"|3rd|||-||-||-||
| style="text-align:center;"|-
|- 
| style="text-align:left;"|Tokorozawa Broncos
| style="text-align:left;"|2000
| -||-||-|||| style="text-align:center;"|3rd|||-||-||-||
| style="text-align:center;"|-
|- 
| style="text-align:left;"|Tokorozawa Broncos
| style="text-align:left;"|2001
| -||-||-|||| style="text-align:center;"|3rd|||-||-||-||
| style="text-align:center;"|-
|- 
| style="text-align:left;"|Rera Kamuy Hokkaido
| style="text-align:left;"|2007-08
| 35||8||27|||| style="text-align:center;"|8th|||-||-||-||
| style="text-align:center;"|-
|- 
| style="text-align:left;"|Rera Kamuy Hokkaido
| style="text-align:left;"|2008-09
| 35||14||21|||| style="text-align:center;"|7th|||-||-||-||
| style="text-align:center;"|-
|- 
| style="text-align:left;"|Rera Kamuy Hokkaido
| style="text-align:left;"|2009-10
| 42||12||30|||| style="text-align:center;"|7th|||-||-||-||
| style="text-align:center;"|-
|- 
| style="text-align:left;"|Hamamatsu Higashimikawa Phoenix
| style="text-align:left;"|2013
| 14||5||9|||| style="text-align:center;"|6th in Western|||2||0||2||
| style="text-align:center;"|Lost in 1st round
|- 
| style="text-align:left;"|Hamamatsu Higashimikawa Phoenix
| style="text-align:left;"|2013-14
| 52||27||25|||| style="text-align:center;"|4th in Western|||5||2||3||
| style="text-align:center;"|Lost in 2nd round
|- 
| style="text-align:left;"|Hamamatsu Higashimikawa Phoenix
| style="text-align:left;"|2014-15
| 52||41||11|||| style="text-align:center;"|3rd in Western|||6||6||0||
| style="text-align:center;"|Bj Champions
|- 
| style="text-align:left;"|Hamamatsu Higashimikawa Phoenix
| style="text-align:left;"|2015-16
| 52||36||16|||| style="text-align:center;"|4th in Western|||2||0||2||
| style="text-align:center;"|Lost in 1st round
|-

References

1970 births
Living people
Alvark Tokyo coaches
Japanese basketball coaches
Levanga Hokkaido coaches
Saitama Broncos coaches
San-en NeoPhoenix coaches